Ballads is a jazz album by John Coltrane released in January 1963 by Impulse! Records. It was recorded in December 1961 and 1962, and released with catalogue number A-32 (mono) and AS-32 (stereo). Critic Gene Lees stated that the quartet had never played the tunes before. "They arrived with music-store sheet music of the songs" and just before the recordings, they "would discuss each tune, write out copies of the changes they'd use, semi-rehearse for a half hour and then do it". Each piece was recorded in one take, except for "All or Nothing at All". In 2008, the album was a recipient of the Grammy Hall of Fame award.

Track listing

Original 
 "Say It (Over and Over Again)" (Jimmy McHugh)– 4:18
 "You Don't Know What Love Is" (Gene DePaul)– 5:15
 "Too Young to Go Steady" (Jimmy McHugh)– 4:23
 "All or Nothing at All" (Arthur Altman)– 3:39
 "I Wish I Knew" (Harry Warren)– 4:54
 "What's New?" (Bob Haggart)– 3:47
 "It's Easy to Remember" (Richard Rodgers)– 2:49
 "Nancy (With the Laughing Face)" (Jimmy Van Heusen)– 3:10

2002 deluxe edition 
Disc two
 "They Say It's Wonderful"
 "All or Nothing at All" - Alternate take
 "Greensleeves" - Alternate take
 "Greensleeves" - Alternate take
 "Greensleeves" - Alternate take
 "Greensleeves" - Master take
 "Greensleeves" - Alternate take
 "It's Easy to Remember" - Alternate take
 "It's Easy to Remember" - Alternate take
 "It's Easy to Remember" - Alternate take
 "It's Easy to Remember" - Alternate take
 "It's Easy to Remember" - Alternate take
 "It's Easy to Remember" - Alternate take
 "It's Easy to Remember" - Alternate take

Personnel 
 John Coltrane – tenor saxophone
 McCoy Tyner – piano
 Jimmy Garrison (#1-6, 8), Reggie Workman (#7; Disc 2, #3-14) – bass
 Elvin Jones – drums

Production 
 Rudy Van Gelder – recording engineer
 Jim Marshall – photography

References 

1963 albums
Impulse! Records albums
John Coltrane albums
Albums produced by Bob Thiele
Albums recorded at Van Gelder Studio